Zhasulan Ubaydauly Moldakarayev (born 7 May 1987) is a Kazakh professional footballer who plays for FC Okzhetpes.

Career

Club
In December 2015, Moldakarayev signed for FC Okzhetpes. After a move to Altai Semey fell through in December 2016, Moldakarayev signed for FC Tobol in February 2017.

International
Moldakarayev made his debut for Kazakhstan on 30 August 2016, in a friendly against Kyrgyzstan.

Career statistics

Club

International

Statistics accurate as of match played 11 November 2016

References

External links
 

1987 births
Living people
Kazakhstani footballers
Association football forwards
Kazakhstan international footballers
FC Kaisar players
FC Okzhetpes players
FC Tobol players
FC Ordabasy players